The Minnesota College Athletic Conference (MCAC) - formerly the Minnesota Community College Conference - is a junior college collegiate athletic conference in the National Junior College Athletic Association (NJCAA) and they compete primarily at the NJCAA Division III level in most sports. The 23 member institutions are located exclusively in the Midwest, including Minnesota, North Dakota and Wisconsin. Football and Wrestling are single-division sports in the NJCAA. The MCCC was established in the fall of 1967.

History
In 2017, the MCAC partnered with USA High School Clay Target League to form the first two-year college varsity Clay Target league.  Clay target programs have grown from five schools at the inception of the league to 12 programs in 2020.  

North Dakota State College of Science and Dakota College-Bottineau joined the conference in football only beginning with the 2014 season; NDSCS added Clay Target in the fall of 2019 and is a member of the MCAC in the sport of Clay Target. 

Dakota College-Bottineau and Northland Community & Technical College announced the discontinuing of football after the fall of 2019.   

Alexandria Technical & Community College joined the MCAC in the fall of 2019 and announced their intent to become a member of the NJCAA in the fall 2020.  ATCC stated it intends to field new teams in the NJCAA sports of golf and eSports, and will continue to field a Clay Target program.  

Century College joined the MCAC in the spring of 2019, competing in the NJCAA sports of baseball and women's volleyball.  Century eliminated the women's softball team, women's soccer team and men's soccer team in 2018.  

Southwest (WI) Technical College joined the MCAC in the fall of 2018, competing in the sports of Clay Target and golf. 

Pine Technical & Community College joined the MCAC in the fall of 2018, competing in the sport of Clay Target. 

Lake Region State College joined the MCAC in the fall of 2018 competing in the sport of Clay Target. 

North Dakota State College of Science added Clay Target to their athletic offerings in 2019; NDSCS continues to be a member of the MCAC in the sport of football.

Member schools

Current members
The MCAC currently has 20 full members, all but one are public schools:

Notes

Associate members
The MCAC currently has five associate members, all are public schools:

Notes

Former members
The MCAC had one former full member, which was also a public school:

Notes

Sports

See also
 National Junior College Athletic Association (NJCAA)
 Mon-Dak Conference, also in NJCAA Region 13

References

External links
 Official website
 NJCAA Website
 MCAC Hall of Fame  

NJCAA conferences
College sports in Minnesota